Topanga (Tongva: Topaa'nga) is a census-designated place (CDP) in western Los Angeles County, California, United States. Located in the Santa Monica Mountains, the community exists in Topanga Canyon and the surrounding hills. The narrow southern portion of Topanga at the coast is between the city of Malibu and the Los Angeles neighborhood of Pacific Palisades. As of the 2020 census the population of the Topanga CDP was 8,560. The ZIP code is 90290 and the area code is primarily 310, with 818 only at the north end of the canyon. It is in the 3rd County Supervisorial district.

History
Topanga is the name given to the area by the Native American indigenous Tongva tribe, and may mean "where the mountain meets the sea" or "a place above." The name in the Tongva language, Topaa'nga, has a root  that likely comes from the Chumash language. It was the western border of their territory, abutting the Chumash tribe that occupied the coast from Malibu northwards. Bedrock mortars can be found carved into rock outcroppings in many locations.

Topanga was then colonized by Mexicans in 1839. In the 1920s, Topanga Canyon became a weekend getaway for Hollywood stars with several cottages built for that purpose. The rolling hills and ample vegetation served to provide both privacy and attractive surroundings for the rich and famous. 
During the 1960s, Topanga Canyon became a magnet to many new artists. In 1965 Wallace Berman settled in the area. For a time, Neil Young lived in Topanga, first living with producer David Briggs then later buying his own house. He recorded most of his After the Gold Rush album in his basement studio in 1970. Charles Manson had previously been living in Topanga, where he had briefly befriended both Neil Young and Dennis Wilson of The Beach Boys. Members of the Manson Family began their campaign of murder on July 31, 1969, with the murder of Topanga resident Gary Hinman, a music teacher who had opened his home to anyone needing shelter.

Geography

Topanga Canyon
Topanga Creek drains Topanga Canyon and is the third largest watershed entering the Santa Monica Bay. The creek is one of the few remaining undammed waterways in the area, and is a spawning ground for steelhead trout. Topanga Beach lies on the coast at the outlet of Topanga Creek. Topanga Canyon Boulevard, State Route 27, is the principal thoroughfare, connecting the Ventura Freeway (US 101) to the north with Pacific Coast Highway (SR 1) on the south. The southern portion of the boulevard largely follows Topanga Creek. North of the Old Topanga Canyon Road intersection, the boulevard traverses the Santa Monica Mountains.

Topanga Canyon contains lands of Topanga State Park, the largest park in the Santa Monica Mountains and one of the largest open space preserves surrounded by a city in the world, as well as the Santa Monica Mountains Conservancy. It is part of the Santa Monica Mountains National Recreation Area. It primarily represents a California coastal sage and chaparral ecoregion, with large areas of the California oak woodland plant community, and a wide variety of native plants.

Climate
This region experiences warm (but not hot) and dry summers, with no average monthly temperatures above .  According to the Köppen Climate Classification system, Topanga has a warm-summer Mediterranean climate, abbreviated "Csb" on climate maps.

Demographics
The 2010 United States Census reported that Topanga had a population of 8,289. Topanga had a median household income of $120,711, with only 5.9% of the population living below the poverty line. The racial makeup of Topanga was 7,313 (88.2%) White (84.5% Non-Hispanic White), 117 (1.4%) African American, 35 (0.4%) Native American, 353 (4.3%) Asian, 3 (0.0%) Pacific Islander, 125 (1.5%) from other races, and 343 (4.1%) from two or more races. Hispanic or Latino of any race were 534 persons (6.4%).

The Census reported that 8,289 people (100% of the population) lived in households, 0 (0%) lived in non-institutionalized group quarters, and 0 (0%) were institutionalized.

There were 3,442 households, out of which 996 (28.9%) had children under the age of 18 living in them, 1,772 (51.5%) were opposite-sex married couples living together, 262 (7.6%) had a female householder with no husband present, 140 (4.1%) had a male householder with no wife present.  There were 239 (6.9%) unmarried opposite-sex partnerships, and 49 (1.4%) same-sex married couples or partnerships. 903 households (26.2%) were made up of individuals, and 256 (7.4%) had someone living alone who was 65 years of age or older. The average household size was 2.41.  There were 2,174 families (63.2% of all households); the average family size was 2.87.

The population was 1,682 people (20.3%) under the age of 18, 333 people (4.0%) aged 18 to 24, 1,917 people (23.1%) aged 25 to 44, 3,188 people (38.5%) aged 45 to 64, and 1,169 people (14.1%) who were 65 years of age or older.  The median age was 46.1 years. For every 100 females, there were 97.9 males.  For every 100 females age 18 and over, there were 96.2 males.

The homeowner vacancy rate was 2.2%; the rental vacancy rate was 3.8%.  6,597 people (79.6% of the population) lived in owner-occupied housing units and 1,692 people (20.4%) lived in rental housing units.

Lower Topanga Canyon
The bottom of Topanga Canyon, where it meets Pacific Coast Highway and the ocean, was owned for many years by the Los Angeles Athletic Club, a wealthy private club in downtown Los Angeles. The  parcel was rented out to a variety of businesses and residents for decades at remarkably low rents, considering that it borders the city of Malibu. Thus Lower Topanga became unique as one of the last outposts of the classic Topanga Canyon bohemian hippie lifestyle.

The Chumash people considered Lower Topanga a sacred, economic, and cultural meeting place for tribes all along the coast. One of the main neighborhoods, the "Rodeo Grounds", takes its name from an actual rodeo arena that existed there on a Mexican ranch in the 1800s.

In the early 1900s, Lower Topanga was a Japanese fishing village. William Randolph Hearst owned the property for a time and turned it into a weekend getaway spot with beach shacks for his and Marion Davies' guests.

In the '60s, a lively community of artists and surfers sprang up in Lower Topanga. They maintained their houses without assistance, sometimes digging them out of the mud after floods or setting backfires to prevent a spreading wildfire from burning down their neighborhood. The roads remained unpaved.

In 2001, Lower Topanga was sold to California State Parks. Even though the Lower Topanga community occupied less than 2% of the total purchased land, State Parks had an aggressive policy to relocate everyone and bulldoze all of the houses. (State Parks had already evicted residents who lived directly on Topanga Beach in the late '70s.)

A group of 10 Lower Topanga poets calling themselves the "Idlers of the Bamboo Grove" published a book of the same name in 2002, celebrating their community and lamenting the prospect of having to leave. Their publisher, Brass Tacks Press, continued publishing works about Lower Topanga, as well as maintaining an online Lower Topanga Photo Archive.

Even though Lower Topanga residents were given money to leave, some fought bitterly against their relocation in court. However, the last holdouts were forced off the land in March 2006. Currently there are active efforts by TreePeople and Mountains Restoration Trust to restore the area to its pristine condition as it was prior to development.

Culture
Topanga is known as a bohemian enclave attracting artists, musicians, filmmakers, and others. Numerous music festivals have been organized in the canyon, including the Topanga Days Festival and Topanga Earth Day. The Topanga Film Institute hosts the annual Topanga Film Festival.

In the 1950s, blacklisted actor Will Geer had to sell his large Santa Monica home and move his family to a small plot in the canyon where they could grow their own produce. Geer's friend Woody Guthrie had a small shack on the property. They unintentionally founded what became an artists' colony. Since its founding in 1973, the Geer family has continued to operate the Will Geer Theatricum Botanicum. It has grown into an Equity theater, and occupies a natural outdoor amphitheater. It features Shakespearean plays, modern classics, and original productions, as well as musical concerts. Performers have included Pete Seeger, Arlo Guthrie, Della Reese, and Burl Ives. Odetta was part of the early music scene in the 1960s.

A famous venue in the canyon was the Elysium Institute, also known as Elysium Fields, a nudist club started by Ed Lange in 1967. After surviving extended battles with county officials the  property was sold in 2002 by its founder's heirs.

Every Memorial Day weekend on the grounds of the Topanga Community House, Topanga has an annual fair and parade, called Topanga Days. Topanga Days Country Fair features music, belly dancing, over 80 unique craft vendors and a variety of food from Cajun to Mexican to vegan. A parade is held on Memorial Day. The parade is said to have inspired the more famous Doo-Dah Parade in Pasadena, California.

Topanga Canyon also hosts an annual reggae festival titled Reggae on the Mountain that has grown to be one of the largest events in the area. The event serves as a fundraiser for the Topanga Community Club in a similar fashion as Topanga Days.

The Topanga Film Institute presents the annual Topanga Film Festival each July. The festival endeavors to bridge cultures, create and expand community, provide cultural exchange and networking opportunities.

Two outdoor shopping centers featuring local businesses form the hub of local commerce. There are no hotels, motels or gas stations in Topanga, nor are there any chain or big box stores.

The location of Topanga in the Santa Monica Mountains also makes the natural surroundings an important part of the culture. Streams, waterfalls, cliffs of exposed bedrock, landmark rock outcroppings, and overlooks with panoramic views of the mountains, Pacific Ocean and Los Angeles are common attractions. There are many trails for short walks, hiking, mountain biking, horseback riding, birdwatching, and rock climbing, all of which are important parts of the local community.

Government and infrastructure
The County of Los Angeles Public Library operates the Topanga Library located on 122 N Topanga Canyon Blvd.

The Los Angeles County Fire Department operates Fire Station No. 69 in Topanga as a part of Battalion 5. During the 1960s and 1970s, "problematic firefighters" were placed here under the supervision of James O. Page.

The Los Angeles County Sheriff's Department (LASD) operates the Malibu/Lost Hills Station in Calabasas, serving Topanga.

The United States Postal Service Topanga Post Office is located at 101 South Topanga Canyon Boulevard.

The California Highway Patrol, West Valley Area, handles the traffic on the State Route and in the unincorporated areas.

The Topanga Coalition for Emergency Preparedness (T-CEP) operates an Emergency Operations Center (EOC) near the Topanga Town Center.

Education

Most Topanga residents are zoned to schools in the Los Angeles Unified School District.
 Topanga Elementary School
 A teacher stated in a 1998 Los Angeles Magazine article that the fact that the parents are creative professionals contributes to the school's high test scores. As of 1998 many parents conduct music and art lessons at this school, as Topanga itself is an artists' colony.
 A choice between Revere Charter Middle School or Woodland Hills Academy (formerly known as Parkman Middle School)
 A choice between Palisades Charter High School and Taft High School

The area is within Board District 4. As of 2010 Steve Zimmer represents the district.

Some portions are in the Santa Monica-Malibu Unified School District (SMMUSD). Those portions are zoned to Webster Elementary School and Malibu High School. Some are in the Las Virgenes Unified School District.

Private schools:
 Manzanita School at Big Rock Ranch
 Viewpoint School in Calabasas

The County of Los Angeles Public Library operates the Topanga Library.

Notable people

See also

References

External links

 Topanga Chamber of Commerce
 Topanga Elementary School
 Topanga Journal, local magazine covering Topanga and the surrounding area
 Topanga State Park official website
 Topanga Messenger, the local newspaper. Closed doors December 1, 2016.
 Messenger Mountain News, local newspaper covering Topanga and the Santa Monica Mountains from January 2017 – April 2020.
Topanga New Times, magazine covering Topanga and the Santa Monica Mountains since May 2020.
 Topanga Community Club, home of Topanga Days
 TopangaBands.com, links to over 70 bands from Topanga
 Topanga Banjo Fiddle Contest
 Official report Old Topanga Fire
 Project to save historic Los Angeles County Engine 69 which served Topanga area around 1955
 Topanga Days Country Fair
 "The Fire Next Time", a story on Topanga Coalition for Emergency Preparedness (T-CEP)
 Topanga Creek watershed map 
  The Lower Topanga Photo Archive, hosted by Brass Tacks Press

 
Census-designated places in Los Angeles County, California
Populated places in the Santa Monica Mountains
Populated places established in 1839
1839 establishments in Alta California
Populated coastal places in California